Liberty County is a county located in the state of Florida. As of the 2020 census, the population was 7,974, making it the least populous county in Florida. Its county seat is Bristol. Liberty County is one of only two dry counties in Florida (the other is Lafayette County).

The Apalachicola National Forest occupies half the county.

History
Liberty County was created in 1855 and is named after the American ideal of liberty.

Geography
The county is bordered on the west by the Apalachicola River.

Adjacent counties
 Gadsden County - northeast
 Wakulla County - east
 Leon County - east
 Franklin County - south
 Gulf County - southwest
 Calhoun County - west
 Jackson County - northwest

National protected area
 Apalachicola National Forest (part)

Demographics

As of the 2020 United States census, there were 7,974 people, 2,513 households, and 1,602 families residing in the county.

As of the census of 2000, there were 7,021 people, 2,222 households, and 1,553 families residing in the county.  The population density was 8 people per square mile (3/km2).  There were 3,156 housing units at an average density of 4 per square mile (1/km2).  The racial makeup of the county was 76.41% White, 18.43% Black or African American, 1.81% Native American, 0.14% Asian, 2.08% from other races, and 1.13% from two or more races.  4.50% of the population were Hispanic or Latino of any race. More than 10% of the population are Mormons.

There were 2,222 households, out of which 34.20% had children under the age of 18 living with them, 51.80% were married couples living together, 13.20% had a female householder with no husband present, and 30.10% were non-families. 25.90% of all households were made up of individuals, and 10.60% had someone living alone who was 65 years of age or older.  The average household size was 2.51 and the average family size was 3.00.

In the county, the population was spread out, with 21.80% under the age of 18, 9.40% from 18 to 24, 37.70% from 25 to 44, 21.00% from 45 to 64, and 10.20% who were 65 years of age or older.  The median age was 35 years. For every 100 females there were 144.90 males.  For every 100 females age 18 and over, there were 159.50 males.

The median income for a household in the county was $28,840, and the median income for a family was $34,244. Males had a median income of $22,078 versus $22,661 for females. The per capita income for the county was $17,225.  About 16.80% of families and 19.90% of the population were below the poverty line, including 24.30% of those under age 18 and 24.30% of those age 65 or over.

Politics
Liberty County has shifted rapidly towards the Republican Party in the 21st century. However, as of October 31, 2022, Democrats still maintain an advantage in voter registration, one of only six counties in the Panhandle where that is still the case.

Liberty County is run by a board of five county commissioners, each elected at-large. The following is a list of the commissioners with the number representative of his/her district:
 Dewayne Branch
 Hannah Causseaux
 Jim Johnson
 Doyle Brown
 Scott Phillips

The remaining elected officials are the constitutional officers and the school board members.
County Judge: Kenneth Hosford
 Clerk of the court: Catherine Brown
 Sheriff: Buddy Money
 Property Appraiser: Cindy Walker
 Tax Collector: Marie Goodman
 Supervisor of Elections: Grant Conyers
 Superintendent of Schools: Kyle Peddie

Library
Liberty County is part of the Northwest Regional Library System  (NWRLS), which serves Gulf and Bay Counties as well.

Communities

Town
 Bristol

Census-designated places
 Hosford
 Lake Mystic
 Sumatra

Unincorporated communities

 Estiffanulga
 Orange
 Rock Bluff
 Telogia
 White Springs
 Wilma
 Woods

Transportation
Much like Calhoun County, Liberty County has no Interstates or U.S. Highways, just state roads.
  FL State Road 20 is the main west-to-east route that runs east from the Apalachicola River at the Calhoun/Liberty County line to the Ochlockonee River at the Liberty/Leon County line, passing through Bristol and Hosford.
  FL State Road 65 is the main south-to-north route running from the Franklin/Liberty County line at Sumatra to the Liberty/Gadsden County line north of Hosford.
  FL State Road 12 is a southwest-to-southeast route running from Liberty County in the southwest to Havana in the northeast. It also contains a county extension into Levy County.
  FL State Road 267 briefly runs alongside state road 20 until it splits away shortly after crossing the Leon/Liberty county line and heads north towards Quincy.

See also
 Dry counties
 Liberty County High School
 National Register of Historic Places listings in Liberty County, Florida

Notes

References

External links

Government links/Constitutional offices
 Liberty County Board of County Commissioners
 Liberty County Supervisor of Elections
 Liberty County Property Appraiser
 Liberty County Election's Office
 Liberty County Tax Collector
 Liberty County Emergency Management

Special districts
 Liberty County School Board
 Liberty County High School
 Northwest Florida Water Management District

Judicial branch
 Liberty County Clerk of Courts
  Public Defender, 2nd Judicial Circuit of Florida serving  Franklin, Gadsden, Jefferson, Leon, Liberty, and Wakulla counties
  Office of the State Attorney, 2nd Judicial Circuit of Florida
  Circuit and County Court for the 2nd Judicial Circuit of Florida

Tourism links

 Liberty County Chamber of Commerce

 
Florida counties
1855 establishments in Florida
North Florida